A Decade of Delain: Live at Paradiso is a video and audio release from the Dutch symphonic metal band Delain. It was recorded at the Paradiso in Amsterdam on 10 December 2016 for the band's 10th anniversary.
The live album was released on 27 October 2017.

Track listing

Personnel
Delain
 Charlotte Wessels – lead vocals
 Timo Somers – lead guitar, backing vocals
 Merel Bechtold – rhythm guitar
 Otto Schimmelpenninck van der Oije – bass, backing and harsh vocals
 Martijn Westerholt – keyboards
 Ruben Israel – drums

Guest musicians
 Alissa White-Gluz – vocals on "Hands of Gold" and "The Tragedy of the Commons"
 Burton C. Bell – vocals on "Where Is the Blood"
 Rob van der Loo – bass on "Sleepwalkers Dream"
 Marko Hietala – vocals on "Your Body Is a Battleground" and "Sing to Me"
 Guus Eikens – guitars on "Sleepwalkers Dream"
 George Oosthoek – vocals on "Pristine"
 Elianne Anemaat – cello on "See Me in Shadow"
 Liv Kristine – vocals on "See Me in Shadow"
 Sander Zoer – drums on "Sleepwalkers Dream"

References

External links
Delain Official Site

2017 live albums
Delain albums
Napalm Records albums